iA Financial Group is one of the largest insurance and wealth management groups in Canada, with operations in the United States. It is one of the biggest public companies in Canada. The parent company, iA Financial Corporation Inc., is a portfolio management company which is listed on the Toronto Stock Exchange under the ticker symbols IAG (common shares). The preferred shares of its subsidiary, Industrial Alliance Insurance and Financial Services Inc. are listed on the Toronto Stock Exchange under the ticker symbol IAF.

iA Financial Group companies 
Individual insurance

 Industrial Alliance Insurance and Financial Services Inc.
 PPI Management Inc.
 Michel Rhéaume et Associés ltée

Group insurance

 Industrial Alliance Insurance and Financial Services Inc. (employee plans and special market solutions)
 PPI Management Inc.

Individual wealth management

 Industrial Alliance Insurance and Financial Services Inc.
 iA Private Wealth Investment Inc. 
 iA Clarington Investments Inc.
 Investia Financial Services Inc.
 Industrial Alliance Trust Inc. (as trustee for several registered plans)
 Industrial Alliance Investment Management Inc.
 PPI Management Inc.

Group savings and retirement

 Industrial Alliance Insurance and Financial Services Inc.

Dealer Services

 Industrial Alliance Insurance and Financial Services Inc.
 SAL Marketing Inc.
 National Warranties MRWV Limited
 Industrial Alliance Pacific General Insurance Corporation
 WGI Service Plan Division Inc.
 WGI Manufacturing Inc.
 Lubrico Warranty Inc.

Auto and home insurance

 Industrial Alliance Auto and Home Insurance Inc.
 Prysm General Insurance Inc.
 iA Advantages Damage Insurance Inc.
 Surexdirect.com Ltd. (majority shareholder)

Auto financing

 iA Auto Financing Inc.
 Industrial Alliance Trust Inc. (as trustee)

U.S. companies – Individual insurance

 iA American Life Insurance Company
 American-Amicable Life Insurance Company of Texas

U.S. companies – Dealer Services

 Dealers Assurance Company
 iA American Warranty, L.P. 
 iA American Warranty Corp.

References

Further reading
 Zelmer, Mark. "Let There Be More Light: Enhancing Public Accountability for Prudential Supervision." CD Howe Institute Commentary 603 (2021).

Financial services companies of Canada